The 2015–16 Coupe de France preliminary rounds made up the qualifying competition to decide which teams took part in the main competition from Round 7. This was the 99th season of the most prestigious football cup competition of France. The competition was organised by the French Football Federation (FFF) and open to all clubs in French football, as well as clubs from the overseas departments and territories (Guadeloupe, French Guiana, Martinique, Mayotte, New Caledonia (qualification via 2015 New Caledonia Cup), Tahiti (qualification via 2015 Tahiti Cup), Réunion, and Saint Martin).

The qualifying rounds took place between March and October 2015.

Teams

Round 1 to 6

The first six rounds and preliminaries were organised by the Regional Leagues and the Overseas Territories, which allow teams from within their league structure to enter at any point up to the third round. Teams from CFA 2 enter at the third round, those from CFA enter at the fourth round and those from Championnat National enter at the fifth round.
Teams entering in each round, by region:

Preliminary round

Centre-Val de Loire 

These matches were played on 23 August 2015.

Preliminary round results: Centre-Val de Loire

First round

Mayotte 

These matches were played on 7 March 2015.

First round results: Mayotte

Guadeloupe 
These matches were played on 21, 22, 23 and 29 August 2015.

First round results: Guadeloupe

Réunion 

These matches were played on 21 and 22 March 2015.

First round results: Réunion

Alsace 
These matches were played on 15, 16, 18, 19 and 20 August 2015.

First round results: Alsace

Aquitaine 

These matches were played on 29 and 30 August 2015.

First round results: Aquitaine

Atlantique 

These matches were played 29 and 30 August 2015.

First round results: Atlantique

Auvergne 

These matches were played 22, 23 and 30 August 2015.

First round results: Auvergne

Lower Normandy 

These matches were played on 21, 22 and 23 August 2015.

First round results: Lower Normandy

Bourgogne 

These matches were played on 23 and 30 August 2015.

First round results: Bourgogne

Brittany 

These matches were played on 22 and 23 August 2015.

First round results: Brittany

Centre-Val de Loire 

These matches were played on 22, 23 and 30 August 2015.

First round results: Centre-Val de Loire

Centre-West 

These matches were played on 22 and 23 August 2015.

First round results: Centre-West

Champagne-Ardenne 

These matches were played on 21 and 23 August 2015.

First round results: Champagne-Ardenne

Franche-Comté 

These matches were played on 22 and 23 August 2015.

First round results: Franche-Comté

Languedoc-Roussillon 

These matches were played between 22 and 30 August 2015.

First round results: Languedoc-Roussillon

Maine 

These matches were played on 23 August 2015.

First round results: Maine

Méditerranée 

These matches were played on 29 and 30 August 2015.

First round results: Méditerranée

Rhône-Alpes 
These matches were played on 21, 22, 23 and 30 August 2015.

First round results: Rhône-Alpes (incomplete)

Second round

Mayotte 

These matches were played on 11 April 2015.

Second round results: Mayotte

Guadeloupe 
These match  played on 28, 29, 30 August and 12, 13 September 2015.

Second round results: Guadeloupe

Réunion 

These matches were played on 2 and 3 May 2015.

Second round results: Réunion

Alsace 
These matches were played 22 to 26 August 2015.

Second round results: Alsace

Aquitaine 

These matches were played between 5 and 13 September 2015.

Second round results: Aquitaine

Atlantique 

These matches were played 29 and 30 August 2015.

Second round results: Atlantique

Auvergne 

These matches were played 29 and 30 August, and 6 September 2015.

Second round results: Auvergne

Brittany 

Second round results: Brittany (incomplete)

Lower Normandy 

These matches were played on 29 and 30 August 2015, and 2 September 2015.

Second round results: Lower Normandy

Bourgogne 

These matches were played on 30 August and 6 September 2015.

  Second round results: Bourgogne

Centre-Val de Loire 

These matches were played on 29 and 30 August, and 6 September 2015.

Second round results: Centre-Val de Loire

Centre-West 

These matches were played on 29 and 30 August 2015.

Second round results: Centre-West

Franche-Comté 

These matches were played on 29 and 30 August 2015.

Second round results: Franche-Comté

Languedoc-Roussillon 

These matches were played between 22 and 30 August 2015.

Second round results: Languedoc-Roussillon

Lorraine 

The second round is in effect a preliminary tournament, with the main competition starting in the third round.

These matches were played on 23 August 2015.

Second round results: Lorraine

Maine 

These matches were played on 30 August 2015.

Second round results: Maine

Méditerranée 

These matches were played on 5 and 6 September 2015.

Second round results: Méditerranée

Paris-Île-de-France 

These matches were played from 27 May to 28 June 2015.
Second round results: Paris Île-de-France (incomplete)

Third round

Mayotte 

These matches was played on 9 May 2015.

Third round results: Mayotte

Guadeloupe 
These matches were played on 12, 13 and 26 September 2015.

Third round results: Guadeloupe

Réunion 

These matches were played on 11 and 12 July 2015.

Third round results: Réunion

Alsace 
These matches were played from 2 to 20 September.

Third round results: Alsace

Aquitaine 

These matches were played between 12 and 20 September 2015.

Third round results: Aquitaine

Atlantique 

These matches were played 12 and 13 September 2015.

Third round results: Atlantique

Auvergne 

These matches were played 12 and 13 September 2015.

Third round results: Auvergne

Lower Normandy 

These matches were played on 12 and 13 September 2015.

Third round results: Lower Normandy

Bourgogne 

These matches were played on 12, 13 and 20 September 2015.

Third round results: Bourgogne

Centre-Val de Loire 

These matches were played on 12 and 13 September 2015.

Third round results: Centre-Val de Loire

Centre-West 

These matches were played on 12 and 13 September 2015.

Third round results: Centre-West

Corsica 

The competition starts at the third round in Corsica, due to the small number of team participating.

These matches were played on 12, 13 and 20 September 2015.

Third round results: Corsica

Franche-Comté 

These matches were played on 12 and 13 September 2015.

Third round results: Franche-Comté

Languedoc-Roussillon 

These matches were played between 12 and 20 September 2015.

Third round results: Languedoc-Roussillon

Lorraine 

These matches were played on 12 and 13 September 2015.

Third round results: Lorraine

Maine 

These matches were played on 13 September 2015.

Third round results: Maine

Méditerranée 

These matches were played on 12 and 13 September 2015.

Third round results: Méditerranée

Intermediate play-off round

Alsace 

This match played 23 September.

Intermediate play-off round Result: Alsace

Fourth round

Mayotte 

Four matches were played on 16 June 2015 and one match played on 17 September 2015.

Fourth round results: Mayotte

Guadeloupe 
These matches were played on 10 October 2015.

Fourth round results: Guadelope

Réunion 

These matches were played on 22 and 23 August 2015.

Fourth round results: Réunion

Alsace 

These matches were played 26 and 27 September 2015.

Fourth round results: Alsace

Aquitaine 

These matches were played between 25 and 27 September 2015.

Fourth round results: Aquitaine

Atlantique 

These matches were played 26 and 27 September 2015.

Fourth round results: Atlantique

Auvergne 

These matches were played 26 and 27 September 2015.

Fourth round results: Auvergne

Lower Normandy 

These matches were played on 26 and 27 September 2015.

Fourth round results: Mayotte

Bourgogne 

These matches were played on 26 and 27 September 2015.

Fourth round results: Bourgogne

Centre-Val de Loire 

These matches were played on 26 and 27 September 2015.

Fourth round results: Centre-Val de Loire

Centre-West 

These matches were played on 26 and 27 September 2015.

Fourth round results: Centre-West

Corsica 

These matches were played on 26 and 27 September 2015.

Fourth round results: Corsica

Franche-Comté 

These matches were played on 26 and 27 September 2015.

Fourth round results: Franche-Comté

Languedoc-Roussillon 

These matches were played on 26 and 27 September 2015.

Fourth round results: Languedoc-Roussillon

Lorraine 

These matches were played on 26 and 27 September 2015.

Fourth round results: Lorraine

Maine 

These matches were played on 26 and 27 September 2015.

Fourth round results: Maine

Méditerranée 

These matches were played on 27 September 2015.

Fourth round results: Méditerranée

Fifth round

Mayotte 

These matches were played on 19 September 2015,

Fifth round results: Mayotte

Guadeloupe 
The fifth round is the final round of qualifying in Guadeloupe. The winners of the two ties qualify for the seventh round.

These matches were played on 21 and 24 October 2015.

Fifth round results: Mayotte

Réunion 

These matches was played on 12 and 13 September 2015.

Fifth round results: Réunion

Alsace 

These matches were played 10 and 11 October 2015.

Fifth round results: Mayotte

Aquitaine 

These matches were played on 9, 10 and 11 October 2015.

Fifth round results: Aquitaine

Atlantique 

These matches were played 10 and 11 October 2015.

Fifth round results: Atlantique

Auvergne 

These matches were played 10 and 11 October 2015.

Fifth round results: Auvergne

Lower Normandy 

These matches were played on 10 and 11 October 2015.

Fifth round results: Lower Normandy

Bourgogne 

These matches were played on 10 and 11 October 2015.

Fifth round results: Bourgogne

Brittany 

These matches were played on 10 and 11 October 2015.

Fifth round results: Brittany

Centre-Val de Loire 

These matches were played on 10 and 11 October 2015.

Fifth round results: Centre-Val de Loire

Centre-West 

These matches were played on 10 and 11 October 2015.

Fifth round results: Centre-West

Corsica 

These matches were played on 10 and 11 October 2015.

Fifth round results: Corsica

Franche-Comté 

These matches were played on 10 and 11 October 2015.

Fifth round results: Franche-Comté

Languedoc-Roussillon 

These matches were played on 10 and 11 October 2015.

Fifth round results: Languedoc-Roussillon

Lorraine 

These matches were played on 10 and 11 October 2015.

Fifth round results: Lorraine

Maine 

These matches were played on 11 October 2015.

Fifth round results: Maine

Méditerranée 

These matches were played on 10 and 11 October 2015.

Fifth round results: Méditerranée

Midi-Pyrénées
These matches were played on 10 and 11 October 2015.

Fifth round results: Midi-Pyrénées

Nord-Pas-de-Calais
These matches were played on 10 and 11 October 2015.

Fifth round results: Nord-Pas-de-Calais

Champagne-Ardennes
These matches were played on 10 and 11 October 2015.

Fifth round results: Champagne-Ardennes

Sixth round

French Guiana 
These matches were played 24 and 25 October 2015.

Martinique 
These matches were played 23 and 24 October 2015.

Mayotte 

These match was played on 17 October 2015.

Réunion 

These matches was played on 3 and 25 October 2015.

Alsace 

These matches were played 24 and 25 October 2015.

Aquitaine 

These matches were played 24 and 25 October 2015.

Atlantique 

These matches were played 24 and 25 October 2015.

Auvergne 

These matches were played 24 and 25 October 2015.

Lower Normandy 

These matches were played on 24 October 2015.

Bourgogne 

These matches were played on 24 and 25 October 2015.

Brittany 

The match US Châteaugiron-US Saint-Malo was broadcast on Eurosport 2 France.

These matches were played on 24 and 25 October 2015.

Centre-Val de Loire 

These matches were played on 24 October 2015.

Centre-West 

These matches were played on 24 and 25 October 2015.

Corsica 

These matches were played on 24 and 25 October 2015.

Franche-Comté 

These matches were played on 24 and 25 October 2015.

Languedoc-Roussillon 

These matches were played on 24 and 25 October 2015.

Lorraine 

These matches were played on 24 and 25 October 2015.

Maine 

These matches were played on 25 October 2015.

Méditerranée 

These matches were played on 24 and 25 October 2015.

Midi-Pyrénées 

These matches were played on 24 and 25 October 2015.

Nord-Pas de Calais 

These matches were played on 24 and 25 October 2015.

Champagne-Ardenne 

These matches were played on 25 October 2015.

Normandy 

These matches were played on 24 and 25 October 2015.

Paris Île-de-France 

These matches were played on 24 and 25 October 2015.

Picardie 

These matches were played on 24 and 25 October 2015.

Rhône-Alpes 

These matches were played on 24 and 25 October 2015.

References

preliminary rounds